Judaism is a minority religion in Australia. 99,956 Australians identified as Jewish in the 2021 census, which accounts for about 0.4% of the population. This is a 9.8% increase in numbers from the 2016 census.

There are many estimates of how many Jews are in Australia, with some estimates going as high as 250,000.

History

In 1830 the first Jewish wedding in Australia was celebrated, the contracting parties being Moses Joseph and Rosetta Nathan.

Jewish immigration came at a time of antisemitism and the Returned Services League and other groups publicized cartoons to encourage the government and the immigration Minister Arthur Calwell to stem the flow of Jewish immigrants.

Affiliations

Until the 1930s, all synagogues in Australia were affiliated with Orthodox, acknowledging leadership of the Chief Rabbi of the United Kingdom. To this day, about 70% of synagogues in Australia are Orthodox.

There had been at least two short-lived efforts to establish Reform congregations, the first as early as the 1890s. However, in 1930, under the leadership of Ada Phillips, a Liberal or Progressive congregation, Temple Beth Israel (Melbourne, Australia), was permanently established in Melbourne. In 1938 the long-serving Senior Rabbi, Rabbi Dr Herman Sanger, was instrumental in establishing another synagogue, Temple Emanuel in Sydney. He also played a part in founding a number of other Liberal synagogues  in other cities in both Australia  and New Zealand. The first Australian-born rabbi, Rabbi Dr John Levi, served the Australian Liberal movement. These congregations are supported by the Sydney-based Union for Progressive Judaism.

Demographics

About 90 percent of the Australian Jewish community live in Sydney and Melbourne. 
Melbourne Ports has the largest Jewish community of any electorate in Australia.

The Jewish Community Council of Victoria has estimated that 60,000 Australian Jews live in Victoria. In Frankston, the Jewish community has nearly doubled since 2007.

In Adelaide Australian Jews have been present throughout the history of the city, with many successful civic leaders and people in the arts.

The states and territories with the highest proportion of Jews are Victoria (0.71%) and New South Wales (0.49%), whereas those with the lowest are the Northern Territory and Tasmania (both 0.05%).

The same social and cultural characteristics of Australia that facilitated the extraordinary economic, political, and social success of the Australian Jewish community have also been attributed to contributing to widespread assimilation.

Community success can also be measured by the vibrancy of Australian Jewish Media. While traditional Jewish print media is in decline, new media forms such as podcasts, online magazines, and blogs have stepped into the breach.

People

Academics
Roy Clive Abraham, linguist 
Bernhard Neumann, German-born British-Australian mathematician
Peter Singer, philosopher
Ghil'ad Zuckermann, linguist and revivalist

Artists and entertainers
Lior Attar, singer, musician 
Danny Ben-Moshe, writer 
John Bluthal, actor
Saskia Burmeister, actress 
Isla Fisher, actress
Amelia Frid, Russian-born actress 
Renee Geyer, soul singer 
David Helfgott, pianist (inspired Academy Award-winning film Shine)
Barrie Kosky, opera director
Ben Lee, singer, songwriter and actor
David Malouf, writer 
Miriam Margolyes, British-Australian actress 
Leon Pole, artist
Ohad Rain, Australian-born Israeli singer-songwriter 
John Safran, comedian 
Troye Sivan, South African-born Australian singer, actor and YouTuber
Elana Stone, musician 
Yael Stone, actress 
Felix Werder, German born
Yitzhak Yedid, Israeli born composer

Business people
Alan Finkel, Australia's Chief Scientist
John Gandel, businessman, philanthropist
David Gonski, businessman, philanthropist
Solomon Lew, businessman
Frank Lowy, Slovak-born Israeli Australian businessman
Anthony Pratt, Australian businessman
Richard Pratt, businessman 
Sheree Rubinstein, entrepreneur, women's business leader and advocate
Sidney Sinclair, businessman 
Victor Smorgon, businessman
Harry Triguboff, Chinese-born Australian businessman
Alex Waislitz, businessman
Nick Molnar, entrepreneur, businessman

Legal system
James Spigelman, Former Chief Justice of New South Wales 
James Edelman, High Court Justice
Louis Waller, Legal academic and head of Monash law faculty

Politicians
Hajnal Ban Black, Israeli born author, politician 
Josh Burns, member for Macnamara
Sir Zelman Cowen, politician, Governor-General of Australia
Michael Danby, member for Melbourne Ports
Mark Dreyfus, former attorney general 
Syd Einfeld, Australian politician and Jewish community leader
Josh Frydenberg, politician and former deputy leader of the Liberal Party
Sir Isaac Isaacs, Judge and politician, Chief Justice of Australia, and Governor-General of Australia
Henry Ninio, Egyptian-born Lord Mayor of Adelaide 
Martin Pakula, politician
Kerryn Phelps, president of the AMA and independent member for Wentworth
Mark Regev, Australian-born Israeli diplomat and civil servant 
David Southwick, politician

Rabbis
Raymond Apple, Senior Rabbi of the Great Synagogue of Sydney
David Bar-Hayim, born David Mandel, head of the Machon Shilo in Israel
Eliezer Berkovits, leading rabbinic philosopher, served as a rabbi in Sydney 1946-50
Israel Brodie, Chief Rabbi of the Commonwealth, served as a rabbi in Australia 1923-37
Harry Freedman, rabbi, author and translator
Yitzchok Dovid Groner, head of the Yeshiva Centre in Melbourne, implicated in coverups of child sex abuse
Chaim Gutnick, first head of the Rabbinical Council of Victoria
Meir Shlomo Kluwgant, senior rabbi in Melbourne, implicated in coverups of child sex abuse
John Levi, Rabbi
Karen Soria, Reform rabbi, first woman to serve as a rabbi in Australia
Yehiel Grenimann (formerly John Green of Melbourne),Masorti (Conservative), Jerusalem, author, human rights activist

Sportspeople
Ashley Brown, soccer player 
Jordan Brown, soccer player
Gavin Fingleson, Olympic silver medalist baseball player
Jessica Fox, canoeist, Olympic silver medalist
Noemie Fox, canoeist
Todd Goldstein, AFL Player for the North Melbourne Kangaroos 
Todd Greenberg, former NRL executive
Michael Klinger, cricketer
Jemima Montag, racewalker, Commonwealth Games gold medallist
Jonathan Moss, former first-class cricketer for the Victoria cricket team (2000 - 2007). Played for Australia at the Maccabiah Games in Israel
Phil Moss, manager of the Central Coast Mariners in the A-League, and former soccer player in the National Soccer League
Steven Solomon, sprinter 
Lionel Van Praag, speedway champion 
Julien Wiener, cricketer 
David Zalcberg, table tennis player

Other
Alex Fein, activist and entrepreneur
Sir John Monash, distinguished General in the Australian Army during World War I.  
Richard Kingsland, Royal Australian Air Force pilot during World War II, former Secretary of the Departments of Interior, Repatriation, and Veterans' Affairs
Ikey Solomon, convict transported to Tasmania.
Sharri Markson, journalist
Gregory Sher, Australian Soldier

See also
 Australian Association for Jewish Studies
 History of the Jews in Australia
 List of Oceanian Jews
 Religion in Australia

References

 
 
Jewish Australian history
Jews and Judaism in Australia